Solo Bassfeder (English: Solo Bass-spring) is the third release of Einstürzende Neubauten's Musterhaus project, a series of highly experimental CD releases that were only available via an annual subscription through their website or from shows during their 25th Anniversary Tour. This project was separate from their Neubauten.org Supporter Project, which it ran concurrent to.

The theme of this Musterhaus release is individual compositions and manipulations of a bass-spring by each member of the band. The approaches taken are quite diverse:

 Bassfeder consists of one beat on the bass-spring, broken down into several hundred segments of the same length, each segment then placed 200 frames later than the previous;
 Feder Vice is research into what one could produce from the sound of a single beat;
 Geschichte der F. (History of S[pring]) features Blixa conducting an interview with Andrew, and then using the speech pattern as a trigger for the bass-spring;
 Dingfest is an exploration of what a choir of 50+ bass-springs sound like;
 In  Schlagkraft, Rudolf recorded lighting sparklers on the bass-spring and the subsequent cooling sounds; the voice of a German news reader makes an accidental appearance;
 12 Rythmen Für Bassfeder (12 Rhythms for the Bass-spring) uses selected midi-files, replacing the original midi sounds with bass-spring samples;
 Springtime is a melancholic score for bass-spring samples, string quartet, French horn and flute;
 Nux Vomica started out with the concept of a dub version in mind; every sound except vocals is in fact a bass-spring.

Track listing

 "Bassfeder" (Bargeld) – 4:26
 "Feder Vice" (Arbeit/Röhm) – 10:10
 "Geschichte der F." (Bargeld/Unruh) – 5:36
 "Dingfest" (Bargeld) – 3:09
 "Schlagkraft" (Moser) – 3:32
 "12 Rythmen für Bassfeder" (Unruh) – 6:06
 "Salsa" – 1:02, "Beguine" – 0:22, "Cascara" – 0:32, "ChaCha" – 0:29, "Guaguanc" – 0:11, "Slowsoul" – 0:17, "Guaguanc2" – 0:45, "Mixed" – 0:26, "Motown" – 0:17, "Pasodoble" – 0:26, "Polka" – 0:23, "Samba1" – 0:32
 "Springtime" (Hacke) – 8:03
 "Nux Vomica" (Bargeld) – 5:30

Notes
Personnel: Arbeit / Bargeld / Chudy / Hacke / Moser

NU: bass spring on tracks 1, 3, 4 & 7; processing on tracks 1 & 6; voice on track 3; recording on track 6; bass spring samples on track 6
JA: bass spring samples & processing on track 2
BB: bass spring on tracks 4 & 7; processing on tracks 3, 4 & 7; voice on tracks 3, 4 & 7
RM: bass spring samples, recording, & processing on track 5
AH: samples, recording, & processing on track 6; backing vocals on track 4
Boris Wilsdorf: bass spring on track 4; recording & processing on tracks 1, 3, 4, & 7
Jo Jo Röhm: recording & processing on track 2
Sugar Pie Jones: backing vocals on track 4
Ash Wednesday: backing vocals on track 4
Gordon W.: backing vocals on track 4

Recorded November 2005 in Berlin
Produced by Einstürzende Neubauten
Mastered by Boris Wilsdorf

External links 
Musterhaus Project website

Einstürzende Neubauten albums
2005 albums